The communauté de communes des Pays d'Opale (before 2017: communauté de communes des Trois Pays) was created on 27 December 1996 and is located in the Pas-de-Calais département, in northern France.  It lost four communes to the agglomeration community Grand Calais Terres et Mers on 1 December 2019. Its seat is Guînes. Its area is 189.3 km2, and its population was 25,188 in 2018.

Composition
The communauté de communes consists of the following 23 communes:

Alembon 
Andres 
Ardres 
Autingues 
Bainghen 
Balinghem 
Bouquehault  
Boursin  
Brêmes 
Caffiers 
Campagne-lès-Guines  
Fiennes  
Guînes 
Hardinghen  
Herbinghen 
Hermelinghen 
Hocquinghen 
Landrethun-lès-Ardres 
Licques 
Louches 
Nielles-lès-Ardres 
Rodelinghem 
Sanghen

References

External links 
 Official website of the Communauté de communes des Pays d'Opale

Pays d'Opale
Pays d'Opale